John Beresford may refer to:
John Beresford (Waterford MP) (1738–1805), Irish MP for Waterford
John Claudius Beresford (1766–1846), Irish MP for Swords and Dublin, son of the above
Sir John Beresford, 1st Baronet (1766–1844), Royal Navy admiral, nephew of the Waterford MP
John Horsley-Beresford, 2nd Baron Decies (1773–1855), Anglo-Irish peer, nephew of the Waterford MP
Lord John Beresford (1773–1862), Anglican Archbishop of Armagh, nephew of the Waterford MP
John Beresford, 4th Marquess of Waterford (1814–1866), Irish peer and Church of Ireland minister, nephew of the above
John Beresford, 5th Marquess of Waterford (1844–1895), Irish peer, son of the above
John Beresford, 5th Baron Decies (1866–1944), Anglo-Irish army officer, polo player, great-great-nephew of the Waterford MP
J. D. Beresford (John Denys Beresford, 1873–1947), English science fiction writer at the turn of the 20th century
John Beresford (dean of Elphin and Ardagh) (fl. 1897–1954), Anglican priest in Ireland
John Beresford, 8th Marquess of Waterford (1933–2015), Irish peer, great-grandson of the 5th Marquess
John Beresford (footballer) (born 1966), English footballer

See also 
Beresford (surname)